Avonbridge  is a small village which lies within the Falkirk council area of Scotland. Avonbridge sits just inside the council boundary line between Falkirk and West Lothian councils.

The village lies at the junction of the B8028 and B825 roads and is a bridging point over the River Avon, hence the name Avonbridge. At the time of the 2011 census, a population of 652 residents was recorded.

History
During the nineteenth and twentieth centuries Avonbridge was home to small scale open cast coal mining. The village also had a brickworks in the mid twentieth century, "Avonbridge Brickworks", but today no longer exists.
Nowadays the village is largely residential although Avonbridge is the base of operations for "Stevenson Brothers" a haulage company, whose bright orange heavy goods vehicles transport goods across the United Kingdom.

Toponymy
The name Avonbridge derives from the fact that the village crosses a river. The affix "avon" is often found in the Celtic language which denotes the presence of a river, in this case the River Avon. This is found in Scottish Gaelic as "abhainn/a river," with genitive "aibhne/of a river." Drochaid na h-Aibhne literally means Bridge of the River.

See also
List of places in Falkirk council area

References

External links

Canmore - Avonbridge, Craigbank Quarry site record
Canmore - Avonbridge, Craigend Quarry site record
Canmore - Avonbridge Brickworks site record
Scottish Brick History - Avonbridge

Selkirkshire
Villages in Falkirk (council area)